Andon Zaho (born 8 November 1943) is an Albanian footballer. He played in one match for the Albania national football team in 1963.

References

External links
 

1943 births
Living people
Albanian footballers
Albania international footballers
Place of birth missing (living people)
Association footballers not categorized by position